This is a list of former sports teams from the US state of Mississippi:

Baseball

Minor Leagues

Big South League
Tupelo Tornado (1997–1998)

Central Baseball League
Jackson Senators II (2002–2005)

Cotton States League
Greenwood Dodgers (1934–1940 1947, 1952)
Jackson Senators I (pre-1953)

Texas League
Jackson Mets (1975–1990)
Jackson Generals (1991)

Texas–Louisiana League
Greenville Bluesmen

Basketball

Global Basketball Association
Jackson Jammers 1992-93
Mississippi Coast Sharks 1992-93

Football

Indoor

Indoor Professional Football League
Mississippi Fire Dogs (1999–2002)
Tupelo FireAnts (2001–2004)

United Indoor Football
Tupelo FireAnts (2005)
Mississippi Mudcats (2007–2008)

North American Football League
Gulf Coast Stingrays (2000-2001)

Hockey

Minor Leagues

Western Professional Hockey League
Tupelo T-Rex (1998–2001)

America West Hockey League
Tupelo T-Rex (2001–2003)

East Coast Hockey League
Jackson Bandits (1999–2003)

See also
List of defunct Florida sports teams
List of defunct Georgia sports teams
List of defunct Idaho sports teams
List of defunct Ohio sports teams
List of defunct Pennsylvania sports teams
List of defunct Texas sports teams

References

Mississippi
Defunct teams